Rangifer may refer to:

 Rangifer (genus), generic name of the scientific name of reindeer
 Rangifer (journal); a scientific journal about reindeer husbandry research
 Rangifer (constellation); the Reindeer, an obsolete constellation

See also
 Reindeer (disambiguation)